Peter Hedström (born 13 December 1983) is a professional rallycross driver from Sweden. He races primarily as a privateer in the FIA ERX Supercar Championship and sporadically in the World Rallycross Championship.

The 2001 Swedish junior champion, Hedström began racing with Hedströms Motorsport in 2007. He debuted in the European Rallycross Championship in 2012, and his team moved up to the World Rallycross Championship the following year.

Racing record

Complete FIA European Rallycross Championship results
(key)

Division 2

Division 1

Supercar

Complete FIA World Rallycross Championship results
(key)

Supercar

References

1983 births
Living people
Swedish racing drivers
European Rallycross Championship drivers
World Rallycross Championship drivers